is a Japanese actor, voice actor and singer. He is affiliated with Himawari Theatre Group.

Biography

Filmography

Television drama
Bakuryū Sentai Abaranger (2003), Lad
Tokusou Sentai Dekaranger (2004), Hikaru Hiwatari
Fūrin Kazan (2007), Yokichi Kuzurasa
Maō (2008), Hitoshi Kasai (young)
Karyū no Utage (2011), Takuya Honda

Original home video
Tokusou Sentai Dekaranger: 10 Years After (2015), Hikaru Hiwatari

Anime television series
2002
Cyborg 009 - Aro, Black Ghost (child)

2004
Zipang - Yousuke (child)

2005
Monster - Johan (young)

2008
Michiko & Hatchin - Massan

2013
Gatchaman Crowds - Sanada

2014
Kamigami no Asobi - Tsukito Totsuka  
Mushishi: Next Passage - Rokusuke

2016
Aikatsu Stars! - Nozomu Igarashi
B-Project: Kodou*Ambitious - Kazuna Masunaga
Bungo Stray Dogs - Sakunosuke Oda (young), Atsushi Nakajima
Nanbaka - Jyugo

2017
ACCA: 13-Territory Inspection Dept. - Magi
The Ancient Magus' Bride - Matthew

2018
Boruto: Naruto Next Generations - Shinki
Darling in the Franxx - Hiro
Captain Tsubasa (2018) - Shun Nitta
My Hero Academia 3 - Amajiki Tamaki
Run with the Wind - Jirō Jō
Sirius the Jaeger - Yuliy
Tsurune - Minato Narumiya
Violet Evergarden - Leon Stephanotis

2019
Ahiru no Sora - Yozan Kamiki
Attack on Titan Season 3 Part 2 - Young Grisha
B-Project: Zecchō Emotion - Kazuna Masunaga
Bungo Stray Dogs 3 - Atsushi Nakajima
My Hero Academia 4 - Amajiki Tamaki
Hoshiai no Sora - Itsuse twins
Vinland Saga - Thorfinn

2020
Drifting Dragons - Soraya
Haikyuu!!: To The Top - Motoya Komori
I'm Standing on a Million Lives - Yūsuke Yotsuya
Listeners - Ritchie
Moriarty the Patriot - Fred Porlock

2021
86 - Kiriya Nouzen
Amaim Warrior at the Borderline - Gashin Tezuka
Build Divide -#00000 (Code Black)- - Teruhito Kurabe
Bungo Stray Dogs Wan! - Atsushi Nakajima
Cestvs: The Roman Fighter - Nero
I'm Standing on a Million Lives 2nd Season - Yūsuke Yotsuya
My Hero Academia 5 - Amajiki Tamaki
Re-Main - Minato Kiyomizu

2022
Build Divide -#00000 (Code White)- - Teruhito Kurabe
Shadowverse Flame - Light Tenryū
Shine On! Bakumatsu Bad Boys! - Suzuran

2023
Ayaka: A Story of Bonds and Wounds - Yukito Yanagi
Bungo Stray Dogs 4 - Atsushi Nakajima
Sugar Apple Fairy Tale - Keith Powell
Tsurune: The Linking Shot - Minato Narumiya
Vinland Saga Season 2 - Thorfinn

Original Video Animation/Original Net Animation
Assassination Classroom (2013), Yuma Isogai
Sword Gai (2018) - Gai Ogata

Anime Film
Bonobono: Kumomo no Ki no Koto (2002), Bonobono
Bungo Stray Dogs: Dead Apple (2018), Atsushi Nakajima
Knights of Sidonia: Love Woven in the Stars (2021), Kairi Hamagata
Legend of the Galactic Heroes: The New Thesis - Clash (2022), Niedhart Müller
Tsurune the Movie: The First Shot (2022), Minato Narumiya

Video games
Kamigami no Asobi (2013), Tsukito Totsuka
Kamigami no Asobi InFinite (2015), Tsukito Totsuka

Yumeiro Cast (2015), Hinata Sakuragi
Yume100 (2015), Kanoto
Kingdom Hearts χ (2016), Ephemer
Kingdom Hearts χ Back Cover (2017), Ephemer
Super Bomberman R (2018), Plasma Bomber
Kingdom Hearts III (2019), Ephemer
Namu Amida Butsu! -UTENA- (2019), Kongōyasha Myōō, Suiten
My Hero: One's Justice 2 (2020), Amajiki Tamaki
Olympia Soiree (2021), Shiro Tokisada Amakusa
Touken Ranbu (2021), Hanjin
Angelique Luminarise (2021), Felix
Samurai Warriors 5 (2021), Hashiba Hideyoshi
The Caligula Effect 2 (2021), Kobato Kazamatsuri

Dubbing
Attack the Block, Dennis (Franz Drameh)
The Gifted, Andy Strucker (Percy Hynes White)
iBoy, Tom Harvey (Bill Milner)
Interstellar, Young Tom Cooper (Timothée Chalamet)
Jurassic World (2017 NTV edition), Zach Mitchell (Nick Robinson)

References

External links
 

1993 births
Living people
Japanese male child actors
Japanese male musical theatre actors
Japanese male video game actors
Japanese male voice actors
Male voice actors from Saitama Prefecture